Vauchamps is a commune in the Marne department in north-eastern France. The village was the site of the Battle of Vauchamps in which Napoleon's French army defeated Gebhard Leberecht von Blücher's Russo-Prussian army on 14 February 1814.

See also
Communes of the Marne department

References

Communes of Marne (department)